The Green Front (FV), whose complete name is Green Front – Independent Ecologists (FVEI), is a small green political party in Italy, led by Vincenzo Galizia, a former leader of the "National Youth" (the youth wing of the neo-fascist Tricolour Flame party).

The symbol of the party is a stylized archer.

The Green Front does not declare itself to be of right-wing nor left-wing: it declares to be inspired "by a spiritual conception of life". The party is in favor of direct democracy, anti-nuclear, anti-capitalist, anti-globalization and the self-determination of the peoples.

At the 2008 general election, the party presented its symbol, declaring to run without allying with other parties. However, the party's president invited his electors to vote the For the Common Good electoral list, led by Stefano Montanari and former senator Fernando Rossi. The list got 0.3% of the vote.

At the 2009 European election, the party stipulated an agreement with the Liberal Democrats of Daniela Melchiorre, but the list obtained a mere 0.2% of the vote.

In March 2009, the National Assembly held in Rome changed the party's name into "Green Front – Independent Ecologists" and re-elected unanimously Vincenzo Galizia as National President.

In the 2013 Lazio regional election, the Green Front supported Storace's candidacy for the presidency of the region. The party got 0.07% of the votes, while Storace was defeated by the centre-left candidate Zingaretti.

At the 2014 European election, the Green Front supported the candidates of the Northern League.

In the 2019 European election, the Green Front supported two candidates of the leftist Green Europe list (Giuliana Farinaro and Elvira Maria Vernengo). After the newspaper Il Foglio reported that Green Europe was supported by a party led by a former far-right politician, Giuseppe Civati suspended his election campaign.

Leadership
President: Vincenzo Galizia (2006–present)

External links
Official website

References

2006 establishments in Italy
Green political parties in Italy
Green conservative parties
Political parties established in 2006